WCP may refer to:

Wing Commander: Prophecy, a 1997 computer game
Wing Commander: Privateer, a 1993 computer game
Worcester Park railway station, in South London.
The Workers' Communist Party of Canada, a Canadian political party.
The World Climate Programme
World Cup of Poker
Water Column Pressure
Workplace Charging Program
 WCP (Wide DC electric passenger), a classification of Indian locomotives